Radio Dubuque, Inc is a Dubuque, Iowa based corporation that owns four radio stations.  The company was founded in 2000 by Tom Parsley and Don Rabbitt.  The company currently owns KDTH AM 1370, and the following FM stations, 97.3 The Rock (formerly KGRR), KATF "KAT-FM" 92.9, and WVRE "The River" 101.1.

The Rock offers active rock. KAT-FM plays Adult Contemporary.  WVRE "The River" plays New country music.  KDTH offers adult standards, oldies, classic big band, news, sports, and other special programming.  The stations participate in the CBS and Fox News radio network.

History

Woodward Communications, publishers of The Dubuque Telegraph-Herald newspaper owned KDTH and KATF.  They agreed in January 2000 to sell their stations to the new Radio Dubuque group with Parsley as President, and Don Rabbitt as CFO. KGRR relocated from its old studio on JFK Road to the KDTH/KAT-FM building at 8th & Bluff in downtown Dubuque. Several years later the company constructed an additional FM station, WVRE (101.1 FM) licensed to Dickeyville, Wisconsin.

The company has since moved to University Avenue In Dubuque with a state-of-the-art, 4 station building.

External links
 Radio Dubuque's Website
 Websites for the stations owned by Radio Dubuque
 97.3 The Rock
 KDTH 1370
 KATF 92.9
 WVRE 101.1

Companies based in Iowa
Mass media in Dubuque, Iowa